Foray is a surname. Notable people with the surname include:

 Cyril Foray (1934–2003), Sierra Leonean educator, politician, diplomat and historian
 Dominique Foray (21st century), French economist
 June Foray (1917–2017), an American voice actress who has worked for most of the studios which produced animated films since the 1940s

See also
 Foray, a traditional method of law enforcement in Poland